The 2019 U Sports Women's Final 8 Basketball Tournament was held March 7–10, 2019, in Toronto, Ontario. It was hosted by Ryerson University at the Mattamy Athletic Centre at the Gardens, which was the first time that Ryerson had hosted the championship game. The McMaster Marauders won the gold medal and earned the first Bronze Baby Championship in program history.

Participating teams

Championship Bracket

Consolation Bracket

See also 
2019 U Sports Men's Basketball Championship

References

External links 
 Tournament Web Site

U Sports Women's Basketball Championship
2018–19 in Canadian basketball
2019 in Canadian women's sports
2019 in women's basketball
Toronto Metropolitan University